A  is a type of smock, originating in Japan. First designed to protect kimono from stains when cooking, it has baggy sleeves with gathered cuffs terminating just after the elbow, and the torso comes down to the wearer's knees. It closes by means of strips of cloth that are tied at the back of the neck and waist. It is particularly used when cooking and cleaning.

The  was introduced at Japan's first culinary academy, Akahori Kappō School, in 1902, when most people wore kimono on a daily basis.

References

External links

Japanese clothing
Aprons
Gowns
1902 introductions
Japanese words and phrases